(E)-4-Hydroxy-3-methyl-but-2-enyl pyrophosphate (HMBPP or HMB-PP) is an intermediate of the  MEP pathway (non-mevalonate pathway) of isoprenoid biosynthesis. The enzyme HMB-PP synthase (GcpE, IspG) catalyzes the conversion of 2-C-methyl-D-erythritol 2,4-cyclodiphosphate (MEcPP) into HMB-PP. HMB-PP is then converted further to isopentenyl pyrophosphate (IPP) and dimethylallyl pyrophosphate (DMAPP) by HMB-PP reductase (LytB, IspH).

HMB-PP is an essential metabolite in most pathogenic bacteria including Mycobacterium tuberculosis as well as in malaria parasites, but is absent from the human host.

HMB-PP is the physiological activator ("phosphoantigen") for human Vγ9/Vδ2 T cells, the major γδ T cell population in peripheral blood. With a bioactivity of 0.1 nM it is 10,000-10,000,000 times more potent than any other natural compound, such as IPP or alkyl amines. HMB-PP functions in this capacity by binding the B30.2 domain of BTN3A1.

References

External links
 

Biomolecules
Metabolism
Organophosphates
Hemiterpenes